Bambang Susantono (born 4 November 1963) is an Indonesian transportation engineer and economist who is the Head of Nusantara Capital City Authority since 10 March 2022. He was a vice minister of Ministry of Transportation and later become acting Minister of Transportation served under Susilo Bambang Yudhoyono's second administration.

Early life and education 
Bambang was born on 4 November 1963 in Yogyakarta. He completed his undergraduate degree in civil engineering from the Bandung Institute of Technology in 1987. He later obtained scholarship to continue his studies at the University of California. In the University of California he obtained his master's degree in City and Regional Planning in 1996, master's degree in Transportation Engineering in 1998, and PhD degree in Infrastructure Planning in 2000.

Careers 

After graduation from Bandung Institute of Technology, Bambang joined Department of Public Works (now Ministry of Public Works and Housing). He worked as government officers here until finally was transferred to Coordinating Ministry of Economical Affairs. The highest position as government officer he attained was Deputy of Infrastructure Coordination and Area Development of the Coordinating Ministry of Economical Affairs which achieved in 2010.

He also an educator. He had been become a visiting professor of Faculty of Engineering University of Indonesia and Land Transportation College (now Indonesian Land Transportation Polytechnic).

He was appointed as Deputy Minister of Transportation on 11 November 2009 by Susilo Bambang Yudhoyono through Presidential Decision No. 111/N/2009, although the appointment with other deputy ministers quite controversial as he and many of early deputy ministers were government employee in service. His appointment as deputy minister of transportation was the first after the post was last occupied by A.S. de Rozari in 1957 and the post is dormant since then. He was inaugurated as deputy minister on 6 January 2010 until 1 October 2014. He briefly become acting minister of transportation from 1 October 2014 to 20 October 2014, when Ernest Evert Mangindaan, the minister of transportation resigned after being succeeded to be a congressman following 2014 Indonesian legislative election. He was Minister of Transportation in charge before transferred the power to Ignasius Jonan.

After no longer in ministry, Bambang moved to Philippines, sitting as vice president for Knowledge Management and Sustainable Development of the Asian Development Bank.

Head of Nusantara Capital City Authority 
There was report that Joko Widodo favored Bambang to become Head of Nusantara Capital City Authority over a list of politicians and figures after an unnamed government official leaked it to the press. However, Executive Office of the President of the Republic of Indonesia always deflected the information. It later confirmed that Joko Widodo choice is true. He is expected to appoint Bambang as Head on 10 March 2022.

Personal life 
Bambang is married to Lusie. Together, they had two daughters: Buya and Dian Nisa.

Bambang is a muslim. Bambang, and also his deputy, Dhony, supported by Nahdlatul Ulama young activists.

References 

1963 births
21st-century Indonesian economists
Indonesian engineers
People from Yogyakarta
Bandung Institute of Technology alumni
University of California alumni
Living people
Transport engineers